The 1928 Pacific Tigers football team represented the College of the Pacific—now known as the University of the Pacific—in Stockton, California as a member of the Far Western Conference (FWC) during the 1928 college football season. The team was led by eighth-year head coach Erwin Righter, and played home games at a field on campus in Stockton. Pacific compiled an overall record of 5–2 with a mark of 2–1 in conference play, placing fourth in the FWC. The Tigers outscored their opponents 95–64 for the season.

Schedule

Notes

References

Pacific
Pacific Tigers football seasons
Pacific Tigers football